The Pentax ME was a 1976-introduced, aperture priority automatic camera with an electronic focal plane shutter from 8 s to 1/1000 s, synchronized at 1/100 s. The shutter curtains were metal and had a vertical movement. There was no shutter dial, and the camera could not be used in manual mode, except for B and 1/100 exposures. The Pentax-invented digital light meter was of the standard TTL open aperture center weighted type. It was activated by a slight pressure on the release button.

The Pentax ME had a 0.97× viewfinder, covering 92% of the field. The finder screen was fixed, with a split image and a microprism ring in the center. The shutter speed chosen by the camera was displayed in the finder, the aperture was not.

There was a hot shoe on the top of the prism and a self-timer. The selector around the release button had four positions: L (lock), Auto, 100X (1/100, X sync) and B. The Pentax ME could attach an external winder ME I (1.5 i/s) or the later ME II (2i/s). The Pentax ME could also mount a Dial Data ME databack, or the later Digital Data M databack via a cord adapter.

The lenses were interchangeable with the K bayonet mount. Together with the ME and MX was introduced the SMC Pentax-M series of compact lenses.

The Pentax ME existed in chrome or black finish, and a limited edition called ME SE had a brown leather covering with the chrome finish.

It was followed in 1979 by the more advanced Pentax ME Super and the cheaper Pentax MV.

External links 
 Pentax ME, camerapedia
 Pentax ME, PentaxForums.com
 Pentax ME, Bojidar Dimitrov
 Pentax ME ad, 1979, Pentax Corporation

ME
135 film cameras
Products introduced in 1976
Pentax K-mount cameras